SURETRADE was a stockbroker firm with an electronic trading platform created in 1997. It was headquartered in Lincoln, Rhode Island. It was acquired by FleetBoston Financial's Quick & Reilly in 2001, at which time the firm had over 350,000 customers and nearly $2 billion in assets.

History
The company was founded in 1997 as a division of Quick & Reilly by Donato A. Montanaro.

Quick & Reilly was acquired by FleetBoston Financial in 1998. 

In early 1999, FleetBoston considered an initial public offering for the unit but plans were scrapped in October 1999 after the dot-com bubble started to crash.

In an October 1999 Fortune (magazine) article, Montanaro claimed that Suretrade was rated the #1 broker for aggressive traders and #2 for beginning investors.

In 2000, the company launched advertising that promoted market timing.

Suretrade was folded into Quick & Reilly in 2001 as investors wanted more advisory services after the crash of the dot-com bubble.

References

1997 establishments in Rhode Island
2001 disestablishments in Rhode Island
Financial services companies disestablished in 2001
Financial services companies established in 1997
Banks disestablished in 2001
Banks established in 1997
Defunct financial services companies of the United States

fr:FleetBoston